Speed skiing is the sport of skiing downhill in a straight line at as high a speed as possible, as timed over a fixed stretch of ski slope. There are two types of contest: breaking an existing speed record or having the fastest run at a given competition. Speed skiers regularly exceed

History
Official records began with an  run by Leo Gasperl in 1932.

In 1978, also at Portillo, American Steve McKinney's record-breaking run of  made him the first to break the  barrier. It was a demonstration sport at the Albertville 1992 Winter Olympics on the Les Arcs speed skiing course, but was deemed too dangerous after several recorded deaths.

Description
Speed skiing is practiced on steep, specially designed courses  in length. There are approximately thirty of these courses worldwide, many of them at high altitudes to minimize air resistance. The first  of the course (the launching area) is used to gain speed, the top speed is measured in the next  (the timing zone) and the last  (the run-out area) is used for slowing down and coming to a stop. The start point in FIS races is chosen so that, in theory, skiers should not exceed , hence competition is aimed at winning a particular event, not breaking world speed records. At pro races, there is no maximum speed and the speed attained is determined by conditions and safety.

In theory, speeds could continue to increase by using even longer and steeper slopes; this would eventually change speed skiing into something closer to skydiving except with skis rather than a parachute.  Since a slight bump or gentle turn can easily prove fatal at such speeds, there is little appetite for this.

Equipment
Speed skiers wear dense foam fairings on their lower legs and aerodynamic helmets to increase streamlining. Their ski suits are made from air-tight latex or have a polyurethane coating to reduce wind resistance, with only a minimal (but mandatory) back protector to give some protection in the case of a crash.

Ski boots are attached to the skis by bindings.

Official world records
The following records were set in 2016 under FSV (France Ski de Vitesse) rules at Vars, France on March 26, 2016:
Men-Ivan Origone (Italy) .
Women—Valentina Greggio (Italy), .

See also
 Alpine skiing
 Ski cross
 Snowboard cross
 Speed skating
 Speed skydiving

References

 
Former Winter Olympic sports
1898 introductions